Coffeyville Resources, formerly known as the COOP Refinery, is a company which owns an oil refinery in Coffeyville, Kansas. The refinery is owned and operated by Coffeyville Resources Refining & Marketing.

Coffeyville Resources is owned by CVR Energy Inc, of Sugar Land, Texas.

CVR Energy, Inc. was listed as a  2012 Fortune 500 company  and was ranked No. 5 public company according to the Houston Chronicle.

Locations
 Headquarters - Kansas City, Kansas and Sugar Land, Texas
 Refinery - Coffeyville, Kansas
 Refinery - Wynnewood, Oklahoma

History
The refinery was built in 1906 by the National Refining Company, which was then the second largest oil company in the United States. In 1944, National Refining Company sold the refinery to Cooperative Refinery Association. The nickname COOP would remain for years afterward. In 1982, CRA merged with Farmland Industries. In 2000, Coffeyville Resources purchased the refinery.

The plant includes a nitrogen fertilizer plant adjacent to the refinery, owned and operated by Coffeyville Resources Nitrogen Fertilizers. Construction began on the nitrogen fertilizer facility in 1998. The initial build of the nitrogen fertilizer plant included shipping an existing gasification plant to Coffeyville from the West Coast. A Texaco coal gasification plant, originally located in Cool Water, California, was disassembled, refurbished, and its technology converted to be able to gasify petroleum coke instead of coal. It was then reassembled to form the heart of the nitrogen fertilizer operations.

The plant is only one of two fertilizer plants in North America which does not rely on natural gas as a raw material. It first began production in late 2000.

Nitrogen Fertilizer Operations - CVR Partners, LP
Production Process - The technology and processes used to produce ammonia and UAN are complex. The gasifier converts low priced petroleum coke into a hydrogen rich synthesis gas. The syngas is then converted into anhydrous ammonia in an ultra high efficiency ammonia plant. Subsequently, the ammonia is further upgraded into UAN in a fully integrated UAN plant.

The majority of the petroleum coke used in the state-of-the-art gasification process is supplied by the Coffeyville Resources Refining & Marketing, refinery located adjacent to the fertilizer operations which is owned by its parent company CVR Energy.

Historically, petroleum coke has been significantly less expensive than natural gas on a per ton of fertilizer produced basis and prices have been more stable when compared to natural gas prices. By using petroleum coke as the primary raw material feedstock instead of natural gas, CVR Partners’ nitrogen fertilizer business has historically been the lowest cost producer and marketer of ammonia and UAN fertilizers in North America.

In 2011, Coffeyville Resources Nitrogen Fertilizers produced 116,800 tons of ammonia available for sale, and also produced 714,100 tons of UAN.

References

External links
Coffeyville Resources Official Site

Oil companies of the United States
Oil refineries in the United States
Companies based in Kansas City, Kansas
Buildings and structures in Montgomery County, Kansas
Energy infrastructure in Kansas